Claudiu Ionescu may refer to:
 Claudiu Ionescu (footballer born 1984), Romanian football player currently playing for Muscelul Câmpulung
 Claudiu Eugen Ionescu, Romanian handball player who competed in the 1980 Summer Olympics
 Claudiu Mircea Ionescu, Romanian football player currently playing for Montana Pătârlagele